Nadan is a 1951 Indian romantic-comedy film directed by Hira Singh and starring Dev Anand, Madhubala. The film received mixed reviews from critics, but was popular with audience.

Plot

Cast
Dev Anand as Ranjan
Madhubala as Usha
Madan Puri
Mehmood
Manmohan Krishna

Soundtrack 
The music was composed by C. Ramchandra.

Reception 
The film was the sixteenth highest-grossing Hindi film of the year.

On 30 November, Meena Sastri of the journal Thought wrote that the poorly-made film was saved by Madhubala's work: "The incidents connecting the insipid plot are incredibly weak. [...] The main redeeming feature is the heroine's [Madhubala's] appealing beauty and considerable acting talent. This combination helps to carry her through a feeble role." In contrast, Baburao Patel observed that the actress looks ill and her beauty is "destroyed" by pimples. He, however, liked the film.

References

General sources

External links 

1951 films
Indian romantic comedy films
1950s Hindi-language films
1951 romantic comedy films